Brian Harris may refer to:

 Brian Harris (footballer) (1935–2008), English footballer
 Brian Harris (wrestler), professional wrestler
 Brian F. Harris, former university professor at the University of Southern California
 Brian Harris (priest) (born 1934), Archdeacon of Manchester
 Brian Harris, ex-drummer for the Greek power metal band Firewind
 Brian Harris, guitar player for the band Lord Tracy
 Brian Lake (born 1982), Australian rules footballer formerly known as Brian Harris
 Brian Harris (translation researcher) (born 1929), Canadian and British translation researcher
 Brian Nicholas Harris (born 1931), councilman of the City of London Corporation